Kasami sequences are binary sequences of length  where  is an even integer. Kasami sequences have good cross-correlation values approaching the Welch lower bound. There are two classes of Kasami sequences—the small set and the large set.

Kasami Set
The process of generating a Kasami sequence is initiated by generating a maximum length sequence , where . Maximum length sequences are periodic sequences with a period of exactly . Modified sequences are then formed by adding  and cyclically time shifted versions of  using modulo-two arithmetic, which is also termed the exclusive or (xor) operation. Computing modified sequences from all  unique time shifts of  forms the Kasami set of code sequences.

See also
Gold sequence (aka Gold code)
JPL sequence (aka JPL code)

References
 
 
 

Line codes

de:Linear rückgekoppeltes Schieberegister#Kasami-Folgen